The 2008 African Weightlifting Championships was held in Strand, South Africa in May 2008.

56 kg Men

62 kg Men

69 kg Men

77 kg Men

85 kg Men

94 kg Men

105 kg Men

+105 kg Men

48 kg Women

53 kg Women

58 kg Women

63 kg Women

69 kg Women

75 kg Women

+75 kg Women

References 

2008 in African sport
2008 in weightlifting
African Weightlifting Championships
International weightlifting competitions hosted by South Africa